Cyperus drummondii, commonly known as Drummond's sedge, is a species of sedge that is native to the southern parts of North America, parts of Central America, and northern parts of South America.

See also
List of Cyperus species

References

drummondii
Plants described in 1836
Flora of Alabama
Flora of Florida
Flora of Louisiana
Flora of Texas
Flora of South Carolina
Flora of Mississippi
Flora of Bolivia
Flora of Brazil
Flora of Costa Rica
Flora of Georgia (U.S. state)
Flora of Jamaica
Flora of Mexico
Taxa named by John Torrey
Taxa named by William Jackson Hooker